Toy Story That Time Forgot (titled Toy Story: That Time Forgot on Disney+) is an American computer-animated Christmas television special, produced by Pixar Animation Studios and Walt Disney Television Animation that aired on ABC on December 2, 2014. Written and directed by Sam & Max creator Steve Purcell, the special was produced by Galyn Susman. Michael Giacchino composed the music for the special. Most of the regular cast from the Toy Story series reprised their roles, including Tom Hanks as Woody, Tim Allen as Buzz Lightyear, Kristen Schaal as Trixie, Wallace Shawn as Rex, Timothy Dalton as Mr. Pricklepants, Don Rickles as Mr. Potato Head, and Joan Cusack as Jessie, with Kevin McKidd and Emma Hudak joining as new characters Reptillus Maximus and Angel Kitty, respectively. This was Rickles' final TV special role before his death on April 6, 2017, and was the last Toy Story production for five years until the release of Toy Story 4 on June 21, 2019. The special received critical acclaim.

Plot
Trixie, a toy triceratops, is frustrated that Bonnie never depicts her as a dinosaur during playtime. On the 27th of December (two days after Christmas), Bonnie takes Trixie, Woody, Buzz Lightyear, Rex, and aphorism-spouting Christmas ornament Angel Kitty to her best friend Mason's house for a play date. However, Bonnie ends up tossing the toys into Mason's playroom and joining Mason in playing with his new video game console.

Bonnie's toys discover the playroom is dominated by a huge "Battlesaurs" playset that Mason received for Christmas, complete with several humanoid-dinosaur-hybrid action figures led by the gallant warrior Reptillus Maximus and the pteranodon-like shaman The Cleric. Trixie is delighted to interact with them as a dinosaur; she and Rex are armed as warriors, unaware that Woody and Buzz have been taken prisoners. Reptillus and Trixie quickly grow close, but it is soon revealed that the Battlesaurs have not yet been played with, and therefore do not know that they are toys. To Trixie's horror, Mason's other toys are violently attacked in a combat arena. Woody and Buzz are then brought in to fight, but Trixie defends them. The Cleric denounces Trixie as a heretic for bearing Bonnie's name on her foot; she flees to get Bonnie's help, and Reptillus is sent after her. She shows him his own toy package, which enrages him.

In the arena, the Cleric takes control of Rex's robotic armaments and forces him to seize Woody and Buzz. They realize the Cleric is aware of Mason and their status as toys; with Mason preoccupied by the video game, the Cleric maintains authoritarian control over the Battlesaurs, and apparently, the playroom. The Cleric intends to destroy Woody, Buzz, and Angel Kitty by tossing them in the air vent. In Mason's bedroom, Reptillus confronts Trixie as she is about to deactivate the video game. She convinces him that "surrendering" to a child for playtime will broaden his horizons, and he reluctantly turns the game off. Mason finds Reptillus, and Bonnie begins playing with him, which convinces Mason to do the same. The children return to the playroom just in time to unknowingly save Woody and Buzz, and they play with the Battlesaurs and other toys in a variety of non-combat settings. Reptillus calls the experience "glorious".

Back at Bonnie's house, Trixie tells the other toys that she is "Bonnie's dinosaur", and is happy in every role Bonnie has for her. Angel Kitty gives one last moral and inexplicably vanishes.

During the credits, Reptillus happily bears Mason's name on his hand, and looks forward to seeing Trixie at Mason and Bonnie's next playdate, already scheduled for the following week next Tuesday, around 3:30 PM.

Cast

 Kristen Schaal as Trixie a toy Triceratops.
 Kevin McKidd as Reptillus Maximus, a dinosaur action figure.
 Steve Purcell as The Cleric, the leader of the Battlesaurs.
 Wallace Shawn as Rex, a toy green Tyrannosaurus.
 Tom Hanks as Woody, a cowboy doll.  
 Tim Allen as Buzz Lightyear, a Space Ranger action figure.
 Emily Hahn as Bonnie
 R.C. Cope as Mason, Bonnie's friend.
 Jonathan Kydd as Ray-Gon
 Don Rickles as Potato Head
 Timothy Dalton as Pricklepants
 Joan Cusack as Jessie, a cowgirl doll.
 Emma Hudak as Angel Kitty
 Lori Alan as Bonnie's Mom

Production
The special was planned to be a six-minute short, but John Lasseter liked the idea and suggested making it into a holiday special. The special took three years to make, with two years spent on story development. The team took time to design the Battlesaurs as if they were a real cartoon and toy line. The story was made in three acts.

In the UK, Toy Story That Time Forgot was broadcast by Sky Movies and aired on December 6, 2014, four days after the US' air date. The TV special was also broadcast on Channel 4 and then later sister channel E4 in 2017.

Marketing
The first look poster for Toy Story That Time Forgot, created by comics artist Mike Mignola, was released at Comic Con 2014.

Home media
Toy Story That Time Forgot was released on Blu-ray and DVD on November 3, 2015. Bundled with the physical copies is a fake intro to the Battlesaurs cartoon, animated by the Japanese production company Studio Trigger.

Reception 
The special received 6.79 million viewers, and received acclaim from critics. On Disney Channel, it received 3.27 million viewers, making it the most-watched broadcast on the network that night.

The review aggregator website Rotten Tomatoes reported that 91% of critics have given the special a positive review based on 11 reviews, with an average rating of 7.50/10. At Metacritic, the special has a weighted average score of 81 out of 100 based on 8 critics, indicating "universal acclaim".

IGN said, "Toy Story That Time Forgot may not have time for the addicting sentiment that we've grown accustomed to with these characters, but it's still a lot of fun." CinemaBlend rated it 4.5 out of 5, saying "Delivering the humor, heart and toy-filled adventure that we've come to expect from the Toy Story franchise, Toy Story That Time Forgot is another wonderful, entertaining and playful installment to the franchise, and well worth a watch for kids and kids-at-heart."

References

External links

 
 
 

2010s animated television specials
2014 television specials
2014 computer-animated films
2010s animated short films
American Broadcasting Company television specials
Christmas television specials
Animated films about dinosaurs
Films scored by Michael Giacchino
Disney television specials
Toy Story
2010s American television specials
American Christmas television specials
Animated Christmas television specials
Films with screenplays by Steve Purcell
Films directed by Steve Purcell